Perşembe (literally "Thursday", referring to market day ) is a belde (town) in Çaycuma district of Zonguldak Province, Turkey. It is to the east of both Çaycuma and Zonguldak. The population of Perşembe is 2659  as of 2010. The settlement was probably founded four centuries ago. The original population of the village was composed of migrants from Caucasus (probably Kipchaks, a medieval Turkic people lived in what is now Russian steps and Caucasus). Also people from other parts of Turkey were settled in the village. The settlement was declared a seat of township in 1990.

See also
Cape Jason

References

Populated places in Zonguldak Province
Towns in Turkey
Çaycuma